Otzen is a surname. Notable people with the surname include:

Christina Otzen (born 1975), Danish sailor
Per Marquard Otzen (born 1944) Danish Editorial Cartoonist, Politiken
Johannes Otzen (1839–1911), German architect, urban planner, architectural theorist, and university teacher
Robert Otzen (1872–1934), German infrastructure engineer
Volmer Otzen, Danish diver